Rhode Island Auditorium was an indoor arena in Providence, Rhode Island, at 1111 North Main Street. It hosted the NBA's Providence Steamrollers from 1946 until 1949, and the Providence Reds ice hockey team until the Providence Civic Center (now the Amica Mutual Pavilion) was opened in 1972.

Description and history
The arena held 5,300 people and opened in 1926. Through the years, a myriad of events including the Ice Capades, public skating, boxing, concerts, and religious events were held at the old barn. The venue hosted 28 of Rocky Marciano's 49 fights over a 4 year span, from July 12, 1948 (his second fight) to May 12, 1952 (his 41st), just four months before winning the heavyweight title by beating Jersey Joe Walcott in Philadelphia. After the Reds departed for the downtown Civic Center, the Auditorium, for a time, became a tennis venue.

At the height of the Great Depression in 1932, the arena faced financial ruin. Industrialist and Rhode Island hockey legend Malcolm Greene Chace rescued the auditorium from foreclosure.

In 1969, a concert by Sly and the Family Stone at the auditorium was followed by a riot. This led mayor Joseph A. Doorley to ban all rock concerts in Providence; the ban only lasted for a few months.

It was torn down in 1989 and parking affiliated with The Miriam Hospital now occupies the site. In 2009, the Rhode Island Reds Heritage Society, a group formed to commemorate the hockey team, marked the site with a plaque commemorating the team's existence.

Concert dates

See also
 Valley Arena Gardens, a similar venue of the era based in Holyoke, Massachusetts

References

External links
JPEG Karl Robert Rittmann...Rhode Island Artist – Image of Rhode Island Auditorium

Defunct boxing venues in the United States
Defunct basketball venues in the United States
Defunct indoor arenas in the United States
Indoor ice hockey venues in the United States
Sports venues in Rhode Island
Basketball Association of America venues
Basketball venues in Rhode Island
Buildings and structures in Providence, Rhode Island
Providence Steamrollers
Demolished buildings and structures in Rhode Island
1926 establishments in Rhode Island
Sports venues completed in 1926
1989 disestablishments in Rhode Island
Sports venues demolished in 1989
Demolished sports venues in the United States
Indoor arenas in Rhode Island